Pinnacle Mountain may refer to:
Pinnacle Mountain State Park
Pinnacle Mountain (Arkansas)
Pinnacle Mountain (South Carolina)
Pinnacle Mountain (Alberta)
Pinnacle Mountain (Washington)